Joncourt is a commune in the Aisne department in Hauts-de-France in northern France.

It lies near the St. Quentin Canal.

History
On 1 October 1918 during World War I, a battle was fought there that was described by the Allied media at that time as "the Miracle of the War", the 46th (North Midland) Division broke through the Hindenburg Line near the town at the canal. For his courage and leadership in the Joncourt action, the poet Wilfred Owen was posthumously awarded the Military Cross.

Population

See also
 Communes of the Aisne department

References

 http://www.1914-18.co.uk/owen/joncourt.htm

Communes of Aisne
Aisne communes articles needing translation from French Wikipedia